Canbisol (Nabidrox), is a synthetic cannabinoid derivative that is the dimethylheptyl homologue of 9-nor-9β-hydroxyhexahydrocannabinol (HHC). It is a potent agonist at both the CB1 and CB2 receptors, with a binding affinity of 0.1nM at CB1 and 0.2nM at CB2. It is mainly used in scientific research, in receptor binding studies to determine the structure and function of the cannabinoid receptors, but has been made illegal in some countries due to its possible abuse potential as a cannabinomimetic drug.

See also 
 HU-210
 HU-243
 Nabilone

References 

Cannabinoids
Benzochromenes
Cyclohexanols
Phenols